Dorovikha is a rural locality (a village) in Mishutinskoye Rural Settlement, Vozhegodsky District, Vologda Oblast, Russia. The population was 5 as of 2002.

Geography 
Dorovikha is located 67 km east of Vozhega (the district's administrative centre) by road. Dubrovinskaya is the nearest rural locality.

References 

Rural localities in Vozhegodsky District